KWIQ-FM (100.5 FM) is a radio station broadcasting a country music format. Licensed to Moses Lake, Washington, United States, the station serves the Moses Lake area.  The station is currently owned by Alpha Media LLC.

History
The station went on the air as KFMT on 1978-07-17. On 1980-03-31, the station changed its call sign to the current KWIQ-FM. On August 20, 2013, KWIQ-FM moved from 100.3 MHz to 100.5 MHz and dropped power from 100,000 watts to 50,000 watts, although the license for these changes was not issued by the Federal Communications Commission until September 10, 2013.

References

External links

WIQ-FM
Country radio stations in the United States
Mass media in Grant County, Washington
Radio stations established in 1978
Alpha Media radio stations